Santiago Castro may refer to:

 Santiago Castro (footballer, born 1947), Spanish football manager and former midfielder 
 Santiago Castro-Gómez (born 1958), Colombian philosopher and professor
 Santiago Castro (footballer, born 2004), Argentine football forward